Leptodactylus flavopictus is a species of frogs in the family Leptodactylidae.

It is endemic to Brazil.
Its natural habitats are subtropical or tropical moist lowland forests and rivers.
It is threatened by habitat loss.

References

flavopictus
Endemic fauna of Brazil
Amphibians described in 1926
Taxonomy articles created by Polbot